Puffer is an American over-the-top internet television service that focuses primarily on channels, CBS (KPIX 5), NBC (KNTV 11), ABC (KGO 7), Fox (KTVU 2), PBS (KQED 9), and The CW (KBCW 44).

Launched on January 18, 2019, as a streaming service, the Puffer project is led by Francis Yan, a doctoral student in computer science at Stanford University, along with Hudson Ayers and Sadjad Fouladi (also Stanford) and Chenzhi Zhu from Tsinghua University. The project is advised by professors Keith Winstein and Philip Levis.

History 
Puffer was launched on January 18, 2019 by Francis Y. Yan, Hudson Ayers, Chenzhi Zhu, Sadjad Fouladi, James Hong, Keyi Zhang, Philip Levis, and Keith Winstein of the Stanford University research. It is a research study about using machine learning to improve video-streaming algorithms: the kind of algorithms used by services such as YouTube, Netflix, and Twitch. They are trying to figure out how to teach a computer to design new algorithms that reduce glitches and stalls in streaming video (especially over wireless networks and those with limited capacities, such as in rural areas), improve picture quality, and predict how the capacity of an Internet connection will change over time.

Supported apps & devices

Browsers 

 Google Chrome
 Mozilla Firefox
 Microsoft Edge
 Opera
Dolphin

Devices 

 Mac/Windows/Linux computers
 Android phones and tablets
Android TV devices using Dolphin Browser

References

External links 
 

Streaming television in the United States
Internet television streaming services
Internet properties established in 2019
2019 establishments in California
Mass media in the San Francisco Bay Area
Stanford University